In Greek mythology, Eurybatus (Ancient Greek: Εὐρύβατος) may refer to the following characters: 

 Eurybatus, one of the Argonauts
 Eurybatus, one of the Cercopes, a pair of chthonic tricksters who disturbed Heracles while he served Omphale, queen of Lydia
 Eurybatus or Eurybarus, a mythological warrior.

Notes

References 

 Antoninus Liberalis, The Metamorphoses of Antoninus Liberalis translated by Francis Celoria (Routledge 1992). Online version at the Topos Text Project.
 Suida, Suda Encyclopedia translated by Ross Scaife, David Whitehead, William Hutton, Catharine Roth, Jennifer Benedict, Gregory Hays, Malcolm Heath Sean M. Redmond, Nicholas Fincher, Patrick Rourke, Elizabeth Vandiver, Raphael Finkel, Frederick Williams, Carl Widstrand, Robert Dyer, Joseph L. Rife, Oliver Phillips and many others. Online version at the Topos Text Project.

Greek legendary creatures
Argonauts